Tracey J. Eide (born July 31, 1954) is a Democratic Party member of the Washington State Senate. She has represented the 30th Washington Legislative District in the Washington State Senate since 1999.  Eide has served as the Majority Floor Leader for the Senate since 2005.  Earlier in Eide's Senate tenure she served as Majority Whip from 2001 to 2002 and Minority Whip from 2003 to 2004.  Currently, Eide serves as vice-chair of the Senate Transportation Committee. Previously, Eide served as Assistant Majority Whip in the Washington State House of Representatives from 1993 to 1995.

Eide is a graduate of the Harvard John F. Kennedy School of Government Program for Senior Executives in State and Local Government.  She is a small business owner.

Committee assignments

 Early Learning & K-12 Education Committee
 Rules Committee
 Transportation Committee

Personal life

Eide is married to Mark, a judge. They have two children.

References

External links

 Tracey Eide on the Washington State Senate website
 Eide's state-sponsored website
 Legislative profile of Eide on Project Vote Smart
 Biographical profile of Eide on Project Vote Smart
 Biography of Tracey Eide provided by the Senate Democratic Campaign Committee
 Campaign Contributions: 2008, 2006, 2004, 2002, 2000, 1998, 1994, 1992
Campaign website
 Washington Votes profile of Eide

1954 births
Living people
Washington (state) state senators
Harvard Kennedy School alumni
Women state legislators in Washington (state)
21st-century American women
Members of the Washington House of Representatives